The Global Center on Adaptation (GCA) was founded on 18 September 2018. Hosted by the Netherlands, GCA engages in policy activities, research, communications, and technical assistance to government and the private sector, policy development, research, advocacy, communications, and partnerships. GCA's floating headquarters is hosted by the Netherlands in Rotterdam, with regional offices in Africa, South Asia, and Asia Pacific.

GCA is led by CEO Patrick V. Verkooijen, and Co-Chairs Ban Ki-moon and Feike Sijbesma.

GCA's flagship program, in partnership with the African Development Bank Group, is the Africa Adaptation Acceleration Program (AAAP). President Uhuru Kenyatta was inaugurated as Global Champion for the Africa Adaptation Acceleration Program on 7 July 2022. On 5 September 2022, GCA hosted the Africa Adaptation Summit to ramp up solutions and funding for climate adaptation in the African continent. The summit was attended by global leaders including Prime Minister Mark Rutte of the Netherlands, President Macky Sall of Senegal, President Nana Akufo-Addo of Ghana, President Félix Tshisekedi of the Democratic Republic of Congo, among others.

GCA Floating Office Rotterdam 
GCA's headquarters is in the largest floating office in the world, moored in the Rijnhaven in Rotterdam, the Netherlands. The office is off-grid, carbon neutral, self-sufficient, and an example of existing adaptation to climate change impacts such as rising sea levels. The floating office was inaugurated on 6 September 2021 by His Majesty King Willem-Alexander of the Netherlands.

Global Commission on Adaptation 
The Global Commission on Adaptation was launched in The Hague on 16 October 2018. Established by Prime Minister Mark Rutte of the Netherlands and the leaders of 22 other convening countries, the Commission launched. The Commission was co-managed by GCA and the World Resources Institute. In 2019, at the UN Climate Action Summit, the Commission launched a Year of Action to implement the recommendations from Adapt Now and accelerate the necessary transitions for change. The Commissioners oversaw the development of the flagship report and guided the Year of Action. In January 2021, the Global Commission on Adaptation formally concluded at the Climate Adaptation Summit, hosted by the Dutch government. GCA is taking forward the work of the Commission through its Programs.

Secretary-General Ban Ki-moon, with co-chair of the Bill & Melinda Gates Foundation, Bill Gates, and Managing Director of the International Monetary Fund, Kristalina Georgieva, led the group of global leaders from political, business, multilateral, and scientific worlds.

The leaders of the convening countries committed to catalyzing a global adaptation movement and work together to support the work of the Global Commission.

History 
The Global Centre of Excellence on Climate Adaptation (GCECA) was founded by the Government of the Netherlands with United Nations Environment Programme (UNEP), NIES Japan and the Philippines. GCECA, hosted in Groningen and Rotterdam, was launched at UN Climate Summit COP 23 on 14 November 2017. During COP 23, the Centre organised a side event, "What is Excellence in Climate Adaptation?" and supported the launch of the UN Environment Adaptation Gap Report 2017: Towards Global Assessment

The Global Centre of Excellence on Climate Adaptation became the Global Center on Adaptation on 18 September 2018.

References 

International climate change organizations
Research institutes in the Netherlands
2017 establishments in the Netherlands